Events in the year 1995 in the Republic of India.

Incumbents
 President of India – Shankar Dayal Sharma
 Prime Minister of India – P. V. Narasimha Rao
 Chief Justice of India – Aziz Mushabber Ahmadi

Governors
 Andhra Pradesh – Krishan Kant 
 Arunachal Pradesh – Mata Prasad 
 Assam – Loknath Mishra 
 Bihar – Akhlaqur Rahman Kidwai
 Goa – Gopala Ramanujam (until 15 June), Romesh Bhandari (starting 16 June)
 Gujarat – Sarup Singh (until 1 July), Naresh Chandra (starting 1 July)
 Haryana – Dhanik Lal Mandal (starting 13 June), Mahabir Prasad (starting 14 June)
 Himachal Pradesh –** until 17 September: Sudhakarrao Naik
 17 September-16 November: Mahabir Prasad 
 starting 16 November: Sheila Kaul 
 Jammu and Kashmir – K. V. Krishna Rao 
 Karnataka – Khurshed Alam Khan 
 Kerala – B. Rachaiah (until 9 November), P. Shiv Shankar (starting 9 November)
 Madhya Pradesh – Mohammad Shafi Qureshi 
 Maharashtra – P.C. Alexander 
 Manipur – O. N. Shrivastava 
 Meghalaya – Madhukar Dighe (until 18 June), M. M. Jacob (starting 18 June)
 Mizoram – P. R. Kyndiah 
 Nagaland – O. N. Shrivastava 
 Odisha – B. Satya Narayan Reddy (until 17 June), Gopala Ramanujam (starting 17 June)
 Punjab – Bakshi Krishan Nath Chhibber
 Rajasthan – Bali Ram Bhagat
 Sikkim – P. Shiv Shankar (until 11 November), K. V. Raghunatha Reddy (starting 11 November)
 Tamil Nadu – Marri Chenna Reddy 
 Tripura – Romesh Bhandari (until 15 June), Siddheswar Prasad (starting 15 June) 
 Uttar Pradesh – Motilal Vora
 West Bengal – K. V. Raghunatha Reddy

Events
 National income - 12,055,827 million
 1 January - India joins the World Trade Organization (WTO) which has replaced GATT.
 5 March – Delhi Metro Rail Corporation Limited founded.
 27 April - Gangster Auto Shankar hanged to death in Central Prison, Salem, Tamil Nadu.
 14 August – Internet is officially launched by VSNL.
 31 August – Punjab Chief Minister Beant Singh is assassinated.
 21 September – Reports of the Hindu milk miracle surface.
 20 October – Hindi movie Dilwale Dulhaniya Le Jayenge released the longest running Hindi movie.
 November
City of Bombay renamed as Mumbai
 Hindi song Q-Funk became the one of the biggest hit remix songs.
 17 December – Purulia arms drop case
 18 December–26 December – The South Asian Games take place in Madras.
 23 December – Nearly 425 people die when a blaze rips through a school prize-giving ceremony in the northern town of Dabwali in Haryana state, near the Indian capital.

Dates unknown 

 Hajj pilgrimage through sea routes from India stopped following the ageing of vessel MV Akbari.

Law

Births
25 January – Mandeep Singh, field hockey player 
5 March – Tanvi Ganesh Lonkar, actress 
10 March – Bipin Singh, footballer 
19 March – Biswajit Biswas, footballer
26 March – Anshuman Joshi, actor
29 April – K. Maneesha, badminton player
5 May – Alen Deory, footballer.
10 May  Mirnalini Ravi, actress.
6 June – Sadi Jalali, soccer player
8 June – Jacob Lalrawngbawla, footballer
9 June – PU Chitra, track and field athlete
5 July – Pusarla Venkata Sindhu, badminton player
7 July – Anamika Choudhari, singer
22 July – Armaan Malik, singer
12 August  Sara Ali Khan, actress
28 August – Viraat Badhwar, Australian amateur golfer
7 September – Sahaj Grover, chess player
9 September – Rahul Kumar, actor
11 September  Aparna Balamurali, actress.
15 October – Niveda Thomas, actress
26 October  Megha Akash, actress
19 November – Tara Sutaria, actress, dancer, singer and TV host
22 December – Shivam Sai Gupta, visual effect producer and game developer
28 December – J. Meghana, badminton player

Deaths
10 April – Morarji Desai, independence activist and 4th Prime Minister of India (born 1896).
21 August – Subrahmanyan Chandrasekhar, astrophysicist and joint Nobel Prize in Physics winner (born 1910).

See also 
 Bollywood films of 1995

References

 
India
Years of the 20th century in India